2009 Consadole Sapporo season

Competitions

Player statistics

Other pages
 J. League official site

Consadole Sapporo
Hokkaido Consadole Sapporo seasons